White River Township is one of nine townships in Johnson County, Indiana. As of the 2010 census, its population was 42,100 and it contained 16,122 housing units.

Geography

Education
Education is provided by Center Grove, Maple Grove, North Grove, Pleasant Grove, and Sugar Grove Elementary Schools, Middle School Central and Middle School North, and Center Grove High School. Saints Francis & Clare also provides a Catholic education for children in grades preschool through 8th grade.

References

External links

 Indiana Township Association
 United Township Association of Indiana

Townships in Johnson County, Indiana
Townships in Indiana